PlainsCapital Bank, a subsidiary of Hilltop Holdings Inc., is one of the largest independent banks in Texas with approximately $11.8 billion in assets. PlainsCapital operates more than 60 branches in Austin, Corpus Christi, Dallas, Fort Worth, Houston, Lubbock, San Antonio and the Rio Grande Valley. The bank, which is led by CEO Jerry Schaffner, employs about 1,200 people.

History
The bank was founded as Plains National Bank by Alan B. White, former chairman and CEO, in 1988 in Lubbock, Texas USA. In 1999, it expanded with a branch in Dallas, and acquired Dallas-based residential mortgage lender PrimeLending. The bank added branches in other major Texas markets throughout the 2000s. In 2003, the bank changed its name to PlainsCapital Bank.

Today, PlainsCapital Bank operates as a subsidiary of Hilltop Holdings, with PrimeLending as its main subsidiary.

Timeline
1988 - PlainsCapital Corporation acquires Plains National Bank in Lubbock.
2003 - Plains National Bank undergoes name change to PlainsCapital Bank.
2012 - The bank merges with Hilltop Holdings Inc., a Dallas-based financial services holding company.
2013 - The bank acquires First National Bank of Edinburg with an FDIC-assisted transaction.
2015 - The bank’s parent company, Hilltop Holdings, enters into a merger agreement with SWS Group. SWS's banking subsidiary - Southwest Securities, FSB - becomes a part of the bank.
2016 - PlainsCapital Chairman Alan B. White is named Co-Chief Executive Officer of Hilltop Holdings with Jeremy B. Ford.
2018 - The bank’s parent company, Hilltop Holdings, acquires Houston-based The Bank of River Oaks.

Services

PlainsCapital Bank conducts commercial and consumer banking in the state of Texas. The bank is a member of the Federal Deposit Insurance Corporation (FDIC) and states it is an Equal Housing Lender. The bank offers:

 Commercial lending and other commercial banking services
 Treasury management
 Small business banking
 Private banking
 Trust and wealth management services
 Consumer banking

References

External links
 

Banks based in Texas
Banks based in the Dallas–Fort Worth metroplex
Companies based in Lubbock, Texas